Yves Boulanger is a current Canadian diplomat. He is concurrently Ambassador Extraordinary and Plenipotentiary to Ethiopia and Djibouti. He was formerly Ambassador Extraordinary and Plenipotentiary to Mali.

External links 
 Foreign Affairs and International Trade Canada Complete List of Posts

Year of birth missing (living people)
Living people
Place of birth missing (living people)
Ambassadors of Canada to Mali
Ambassadors of Canada to Ethiopia
Ambassadors of Canada to Djibouti